Laurie Shaffi OBE (15 August 1912 – 6 February 2005) was a British–Indian barrister, diplomat and tennis player.

Shaffi, born in London and half-Indian, was an old boy of Emanuel School.

Active on the tennis tour in the 1930s, Shaffi's career titles included the East of England Championships and Essex Championships. In 1939 he earned a call-up to the Great Britain Davis Cup team, on the back of recent wins over Donald MacPhail and Ronald Shayes, both rivals for a berth in the lineup. Unranked in Britain at the time, he was considered a surprise selection and featured in ties against both France and Germany.

During World War II, Shaffi fought with the Royal Air Force. He became Adjutant to Field Marshall Claude Auchinleck.

A law graduate, Shaffi served as Pakistan's Consul General in New York and San Francisco. He married an American and was a long-time resident of Monterey, California.

See also
List of Great Britain Davis Cup team representatives

References

External links
 
 
 

1912 births
2005 deaths
British male tennis players
British people of Indian descent
Pakistani diplomats
British emigrants to the United States
Royal Air Force personnel of World War II
People educated at Emanuel School
Tennis people from Greater London
Officers of the Order of the British Empire